Daddy's Daughters is a Russian TV series produced from 2007 to 2013. Made by "Kinokonstanta" (episodes 1 to 60) and "Kostafilm" (since episode 61) film companies, it is characterized by various aspects of life — family, love, work, study, and friendship. The series has very high television ratings and has won multiple awards (received four "TEFI"). Unlike many other contemporary Russian sitcoms, this is an original series, and is not an adaptation of a foreign show.

Plot 
Protagonist Sergei Vasnetsov (Andrei Leonov), a family therapist from a small private clinic, was in a deplorable situation. His wife, Lyudmila Vasnetsova (Nonna Grishayeva), left him for a hockey player. To make matters worse, his practice is all but collapsing, as all of his patients have left. His wife's departure leaves their five daughters (Miroslava Karpovich, Anastasia Sivayeva, Darya Melnikova, Elizaveta Arzamasova, Ekaterina Starshova) in his care.

Cast 
 Andrei Leonov as Sergei Alekseyevich Vasnetsov 
 Nonna Grishayeva as Lyudmila Sergeyevna Vasnetsova
 Miroslava Karpovich as Maria Vasnetsova
 Anastasia Sivayeva as Darya Vasnetsova (Vasilyeva after marriage)
 Darya Melnikova as Eugenia Vasnetsova
 Elizaveta Arzamasova as Galina Sergeyevna Vasnetsova
 Ekaterina Starshova as Polina Vasnetsova (Pugovka)
 Olga Volkova as Antonina Semyonovna Gordienko
 Aleksandr Samoylenko as Andrei Antonov
 Angelina Varganova† as Olga Antonova
 Tatyana Orlova as Tamara Kozhemyatka
 Alexander Oleshko as Vasily Fedotov
 Maria Syomkina as Oksana Fedotova
 Mikhail Kazakow as Ilya Polezhaykin
 Philip Blednyi as Veniamin Vasilyev
 Lyudmila Gavrilova as Mother in law

Trivia 
 Shooting the series began July 13, 2007. Creators and arrangers of the title song "Daddy's Daughters" are brothers Kristovskiy (group «Uma2rman»).
 At first only 60 episodes were planned. However, because of the huge ratings "Daddy's daughters" was continued.
 "Daddy's Daughters" is the first Russian TV series to get adapted by a foreign channel. German channel Das Vierte began shooting a German remake called "Ein Haus voller Töchter" in spring 2009 and started broadcasting it in August 2010. However, "Ein Haus voller Töchter" received very poor ratings and very poor critical reception. It was panned for its poor and clichéd writing and its overuse of canned laughter. Jan Schlüter of Quotenmeter.de concluded that "television could hardly get worse".
 Angelina Varganova who played Olga Antonova died on January 4, 2013, from pneumonia at the age of 41, before she could finish the storyline of the character.

References

External links 
 
 

STS (TV channel) original programming
2000s Russian television series
2010s Russian television series
2007 Russian television series debuts
2013 Russian television series endings
Russian television sitcoms
Television series about sisters